A Dream of Eagles is a historical novel series written by the Canadian author Jack Whyte. It was published in the United States as the Camulod Chronicles.

The novels are a rendition of the Arthurian legend that attempt to propose a possible explanation for the foundation of Camulod (an alternate spelling of Camelot), Arthur's heritage and the political situation surrounding his existence. The setting series begins during the Roman departure from Britain and continues for 150 years, ending during the settlement of Britain by the Germanic Angles, Saxons and Jutes.

Books in the series

External links
Official website for Jack Whyte.  Includes biography, bibliography, book excerpts, radio interview transcripts, and an active fan forum.
Archived scan from web.archive.org for Jack Whyte's now defunct blog at the penguin.ca website.  Includes questions by readers and Jack Whyte's answers to those questions, as well as general observations by Jack Whyte.

Novel series
Novels by Jack Whyte
Novels set in Roman Britain
Novels set in sub-Roman Britain
Novels set in Anglo-Saxon England
Modern Arthurian fiction